Karl Bär (born 13 March 1985) is a German politician. He became a member of the Bundestag in the 2021 German federal election. He is affiliated with the Alliance 90/The Greens party.

He became a member of the Green Youth organisation (Grüne Jugend) in 2002.

References

External links 

 

Living people
1985 births
People from Miesbach (district)
21st-century German politicians
Members of the Bundestag for Alliance 90/The Greens
Members of the Bundestag 2021–2025